George Florian "Pinch" McBride (November 20, 1880 – July 2, 1973) was an American professional baseball shortstop for the Milwaukee Brewers, Pittsburgh Pirates, St. Louis Cardinals, and Washington Senators from 1901 to 1920. He started off with the short-lived Milwaukee Brewers (they moved to St. Louis, Missouri after the 1901 season and became the Browns), but he only had 12 at-bats in three games.  After stints in semi-pro ball, he joined the Pirates in 1905 but was traded mid-season to the Cardinals.  He did not become a regular starter until the 1908 season, when he joined the Senators and became their everyday shortstop.  He never hit for a high average (his best season was in 1911 when he hit .235 with 11 doubles and 4 triples), but was very talented with the glove, leading the American League in fielding for four straight seasons (1912 – 1915).  He was given the nickname "Pinch" for his ability to hit in the clutch.

In 1921, he was named manager of the Senators, succeeding Clark Griffith, and led the team to an 80–73 record (.523 winning percentage).  At the end of the 1921 season, he was hit in the face with a ball during batting practice, paralyzing one side of his face.  He was forced to retire from the Senators, but later joined the Detroit Tigers. McBride has the lowest batting average in major league history of any player with over 5,000 at-bats, with .218.

McBride died in Milwaukee, Wisconsin at age 92.

References

Sources

External links

1880 births
1973 deaths
Major League Baseball shortstops
Milwaukee Brewers (1901) players
Pittsburgh Pirates players
St. Louis Cardinals players
Washington Senators (1901–1960) players
Washington Senators (1901–1960) managers
Detroit Tigers coaches
Kansas City Blues (baseball) players
Milwaukee Brewers (minor league) players
Peoria Distillers players
St. Joseph Saints players
Baseball players from Milwaukee